The Saunders-Roe A.36 Lerwick was a British flying boat built by Saunders-Roe Limited (Saro). It was intended to be used with the Short Sunderland in Royal Air Force Coastal Command but it was a flawed design and only a small number were built. They had a poor service record and a high accident rate; of 21 aircraft, 10 were lost to accidents and one for an unknown reason.

Design and development
Air Ministry Specification R.1/36 (to meet Operational Requirement 32) was issued in March 1936 to several companies that had experience in building flying boats. The specification was for a medium-range flying boat for anti-submarine, convoy escort and reconnaissance duties to replace the Royal Air Force's biplane flying boats such as the Saro London and Supermarine Stranraer.

Designs were tendered by Saunders-Roe (S.36), Supermarine (Type 314), Blackburn Aircraft (b. 20) and Shorts. The Blackburn B.20 was a radical design that offered much better performance, by reducing the drag associated with a flying boat hull and so a prototype was ordered to test the concept. Of the other designs the Supermarine was the first choice with Saro and Shorts tied in second place. The Supermarine was ordered "off the drawing board" i. e. without requiring prototypes to be produced and flown first. Supermarine's commitment to the Spitfire meant that work was not expected to start for two years and so the Ministry looked to the other designs. Saunders-Roe had redesigned the S.36 in the meantime—replacing low hull and gull wing with a deep body and high wing—and the Supermarine order was transferred to the S.36. The contract was issued in June 1937 to buy 21 of the S.36, receiving the service name Lerwick (after the town of Lerwick). The aircraft was a compact twin-engined, high-winged monoplane of all-metal construction, with a conventional flying boat hull, a planing bottom and two stabilising floats, carried under the wings on long struts. It was powered by two Bristol Hercules radial engines and initially had twin fins and rudders. For defence, the Lerwick was equipped with three powered gun turrets. The nose turret had a single 0.303 inch Vickers K gun; the other two had 0.303 Browning machine guns, two guns in the Nash & Thompson FN.8 turret in the dorsal position and four in the Nash & Thompson FN4.A turret at the tail.

The first three aircraft were used as prototypes, with the first being launched on 31 October 1938, after numerous delays during design and construction. The Lerwick was immediately found to be unstable in the air, on the water and not suited to "hands off" flying. The latter was a major problem in an aircraft designed for long-range patrols. Numerous adjustments, including the addition of a greatly enlarged single fin and an increase in the wing angle of incidence, failed to remedy its undesirable characteristics, which included a vicious stall and unsatisfactory rates of roll and yaw. In service, several aircraft were lost because of wing floats breaking off, suggesting this was a structural weakness. Persistent problems with the hydraulics resulted in bomb doors sometimes dropping open during flight.

On one engine, the Lerwick could not maintain height, nor could it maintain a constant heading, as the controls could not counter the torque of one engine on maximum power. An engine failure would inevitably see the aircraft flying in slowly descending circles. On one occasion, the loss of an engine forced a Lerwick to make an emergency landing in the Caledonian Canal. The aircraft was then towed to Oban at the end of a string of coal barges.

Operational history
In mid-1939, four Lerwicks were allocated to 240 Squadron. By October, the squadron had stopped flying them and reverted to its older and slower Saro London flying boats. The Lerwick programme was cancelled on 24 October but restarted on 1 November. In December 1939, Air Vice-Marshal Sholto Douglas recommended that the Lerwicks be scrapped and Saunders-Roe put to building Short Sunderlands but the production change would have taken months and with the start of the Second World War, aircraft were urgently required.

Production continued and the type entered service with 209 Squadron based at Oban in 1940, replacing Short Singapores; the squadron soon began losing aircraft to accidents. During the service with 209 Squadron, all the Lerwicks were grounded twice for urgent safety modifications; on only two occasions were U-boats attacked by a Lerwick and neither submarine was damaged.

In April 1941, 209 Squadron began receiving the US Consolidated Catalina. The last of a total of 21 Lerwicks was delivered in May but the type was withdrawn from front-line service in the same month. Most of the remaining Lerwicks were transferred to  Number 4 (Coastal) Operational Training Unit at Invergordon; three were sent to 240 Squadron for service trials at the highly-secret Marine Aircraft Experimental Establishment at Helensburgh.

In mid-1942, the Lerwicks were briefly returned to service, for the purpose of operational training with 422 Squadron and 423 Squadron of the Royal Canadian Air Force, based at Lough Erne. By the end of 1942, the type had been declared obsolete; by early 1943, the survivors had been scrapped.

Operators

 Royal Canadian Air Force
 No. 422 Squadron RCAF
 No. 423 Squadron RCAF

 Marine Aircraft Experimental Establishment
 Royal Air Force
 No. 209 Squadron RAF: 1939–1941
 No. 240 Squadron RAF : Three Lerwicks used for service trials.
 No. 4 (Coastal) Operational Training Unit: 1941

Specifications (Saro Lerwick)

Operational losses
Eleven of the 21 Lerwicks built were lost or written off during the three years the type saw operational service.

See also

References

Notes

Bibliography

 Bowyer, Chaz. Coastal Command at War. Shepperton, Surrey, UK: Ian Allan, 1979. . (p. 30.)
 Bowyer, Michael J.F. Aircraft for the Few: The RAF's Fighters and Bombers in 1940. Sparkford, near Yeovil, Somerset, UK: Patrick Stephens, 1991. . (pp. 148–151.)
 Burney, Allan. Flying Boats of World War 2 (The Aeroplane; & Flight Magazine Aviation Archive Series). London: Key Publishing, 2015. 
 Buttler, T British Secret Projects: Fighters and Bombers 1935–1950 Midland Publishing. Hinckley. 2004. .
 Green, William. War Planes of the Second World War, Volume Five: Flying Boats. London: Macdonald, 1962 (Fifth impression 1972). . (pp. 84–87.)
 London, Peter. British Flying Boats. Sutton Publishers. 2003. 
 London, Peter. Saunders and Saro Aircraft Since 1917. London: Putnam (Conway Maritime Press), London, 1988. .
 March, Daniel J. British Warplanes of World War II: Combat Aircraft of the RAf and Fleet Air Arm, 1939–1945. Hoo, nr Rochester, Kent, UK: Aerospace Publishing, 1998. . (p. 191.)
 Mondey, David. The Hamlyn Concise Guide to British Aircraft of World War II. Hamlyn (publishers),1982 (republished 1994 by Chancellor Press, reprinted 2002). . (p. 181.)

External links

 British Aircraft Directory
 The Lerwick on History of War
 British Aircraft of WW2
 Lerwick on the site of the RCAF

1930s British military reconnaissance aircraft
Flying boats
Lerwick
High-wing aircraft
Aircraft first flown in 1938
Twin piston-engined tractor aircraft